Macrolophus pygmaeus is a species of plant bug in the family Miridae. It is found in Europe except the high north, south to north Africa and east to Asia Minor then to Central Asia.

References

Further reading

External links

 

Articles created by Qbugbot
Insects described in 1839
Dicyphini